Earth system governance is a recently developed paradigm that builds on earlier notions of environmental policy and nature conservation, but puts these into the broader context of human-induced transformations of the entire earth system.

The integrative new paradigm of earth system governance has evolved into an active research area that brings together a variety of disciplines including political science, sociology, economics, ecology, policy studies, geography, sustainability science, and law.

Conferences
Major international conferences on ‘Earth System Governance’ have been held in Amsterdam (2007, 2009), Berlin (2008, 2010), Colorado (2011), Lund (2012, 2017), Tokyo (2013), Norwich (2014), Canberra (2015) and Nairobi (2016). In 2017, the 8th Annual Earth System Governance Conference took place in Lund, Sweden. This conference was co-hosted by Lund University during its 350-year celebration. In 2018 it was held in Utrecht, The Netherlands. In 2019, the conference took place in Mexico. In 2020, Brastislava was to host, but events are rescheduled for 2021 due to Covid-19.

Policy engagement 
On 16–19 May 2011, more than twenty Nobel laureates, several leading policy-makers and some of the world's most renowned thinkers and experts on global sustainability met for the Third Nobel Laureate Symposium on Global Sustainability at the Royal Swedish Academy of Sciences in Stockholm. The Nobel Laureate Symposium concluded with the Stockholm Memorandum, calling for "strengthening of Earth System Governance" as a priority for coherent global action. This memorandum has been submitted to the High-level Panel on Global Sustainability appointed by the UN Secretary General and fed into the preparations for the 2012 UN Conference on Sustainable Development (Rio+20).

History 
The new paradigm of earth system governance was originally developed in the Netherlands by Professor Frank Biermann in his inaugural lecture at the VU University Amsterdam, which was published later in 2007 Based on this pioneering contribution, Biermann was invited by the International Human Dimensions Programme on Global Environmental Change to develop a long-term comprehensive international programme in this field, which became in 2009 the global Earth System Governance Project.

Key researchers who have applied the earth system governance framework in their work include Michele Betsill, John Dryzek, Peter M. Haas, Norichika Kanie, Lennart Olsson, and Oran Young.

In 2012, 33 leading scholars from the Project wrote a blueprint for reform of strengthening earth system governance, which was published in Science.

Today, the term ‘earth system governance’ is mentioned on 84000 sites according to Google.

The Earth System Governance Project 

In 2009, the UN-sponsored global change research networks have set up a long-term research programme in earth system governance, the Earth System Governance Project.
The Earth System Governance Project currently consists of a network of around 370 active and about 2,300 indirectly involved scholars from all continents. Since 2015 it is part of the overarching international research platform Future Earth. The International Project Office is hosted at Utrecht University, The Netherlands.

Research centres on ‘Earth System Governance’ have been set up or designated at the University of Ghana; the University of Brasília; Utrecht University; the German Development Institute; the CETIP Network; VU University Amsterdam; the University of Amsterdam; the Australian National University; Chiang Mai University; Colorado State University; Lund University; the University of East Anglia; the University of Oldenburg; the Stockholm Resilience Centre; the University of Toronto; the Tokyo Institute of Technology and Yale University. In addition, strong networks on earth system governance research exist in China, Latin America, Central and Eastern Europe, and Russia.

Conceptual framework 

The Earth System Governance Project organizes its research according to a conceptual framework guided by five sets of research lenses according to their 2018 Science and Implementation Plan:
Architecture and agency
Democracy and power 
Justice and allocation
Anticipation and imagination 
Adaptiveness and reflexivity

These centre around four contextual conditions:
Transformations
Inequality
Anthropocene 
Diversity

Related projects 
 Earth System Science Partnership
 International Geosphere-Biosphere Programme
 International Human Dimensions Programme
 World Climate Research Programme
 DIVERSITAS, an international programme for biodiversity research
 Global Carbon Project
 Land-Ocean Interactions in the Coastal Zone
 Global Land Project
 Urbanization and Global Environmental Change Project (UGEC)
 Global Water System Project (GWSP)

See also
 Earth System Governance Project
 Environmental governance
 Global governance
 Social science
 Sustainability governance
 Earth System Analysis/ Earth System Science
 Environmental Science
 Global Change
 Global environmental governance
 Multi-level governance
 Climate Governance
 Environmental Policy
 Ecological economics
 Ecological modernization
 Sustainability science
 Sustainable Development
 Planetary Boundaries
 The Anthropocene

References

 Biermann, Frank and Kim, Rakhyun E. (Eds). 2020. Architectures of Earth System Governance: Institutional Complexity and Structural Transformation. Cambridge University Press.

External links 
 Earth System Governance Project
 Global Governance Project
 International Human Dimensions Programme , (IHDP)
 Lund University Centre for Sustainability Studies
 Utrecht University, Copernicus Institute of Sustainable Development
 VU University Amsterdam, Institute for Environmental Studies

Environmental policy
Environmental social science